James Whittall was a 19th-century tai-pan of Jardine Matheson & Co. and member of the Legislative Council of Hong Kong.

Whittall was appointed an unofficial member in Legislative Council in 1864. After John Dent resigned in 1867, he became the Senior Unofficial Member. He went on leave later that year, and William Keswick held the seat for him until 1872. Whittall remained an unofficial member in the Legislative Council until he resigned in 1875, and Keswick replaced him again.

Whittall was heavily involved with Jardine Matheson & Co. the silk trade in Japan during a time with strong foreign trade restriction.

References

Jardine Matheson Group
Members of the Legislative Council of Hong Kong
Hong Kong people of British descent
British businesspeople